Nicolas Bonis (born 31 August 1981) is a French retired footballer who played as a goalkeeper. Besides France, he has also played in Spain.

Football career
Born in Wissembourg, Bas-Rhin, Bonis started out professionally at RC Strasbourg, but could never impose himself in the first team during three Ligue 1 seasons. In the 2005 summer he moved abroad, joining Spanish club Pontevedra CF which had just suffered relegation to the third division.

After solid performances for the Galician side, albeit without promotion, Bonis signed for Deportivo Alavés in the second level on a two-year deal, but appeared sparingly (17 matches out of 42) in his first season, which ended also in relegation.

References

External links

1981 births
Living people
People from Wissembourg
French footballers
Association football goalkeepers
Ligue 1 players
RC Strasbourg Alsace players
Segunda División players
Segunda División B players
Pontevedra CF footballers
Deportivo Alavés players
AD Ceuta footballers
CD Atlético Baleares footballers
French expatriate footballers
Expatriate footballers in Spain
French expatriate sportspeople in Spain
Footballers from Alsace
Sportspeople from Bas-Rhin
FCSR Haguenau players